Kalingapatnam  is a village in Srikakulam district of the Indian state of Andhra Pradesh. It is located in Gara mandal of Srikakulam revenue division. It has one of the major beach sand deposits of the state. In medieval era it was famous for the ancient port city of Kalinga. Kalingapatnam is located at a distance of 26 km from the district headquarters and 17 km from Singupuram. 

Dargah Shariff of Shaik Madeena Acquiline is situated at this place.

History
Kalingapatnam (Kalinga Patana in Odia) was one of ancient Kalinga's harbour villages. European merchants disembarked from the ships and made it their port. It was a minor port and Europeans resided here during East India Company regime. Until 1958, huge ships from Malaysia and Singapore arrived at this port. Perfumes, textiles etc were exported to other countries from here. There was a huge coco plantation spread across the local beaches that were also exported. Kalingapatana port was closed during British rule in India to avoid other invaders entering the country. However, the lighthouse constructed by the British at Kalingapatana port stands as a witness to the European regime.

Climate

Tourism

Kalingapatnam Beach is the place where river Vamsadhara empties into Bay of Bengal. Buddhist stupas were excavated by the Archaeological department at Salihundam, Ramateertham etc.

A new Shiva temple is being built near the Kalingapatnam Beach towards Machilesam, by K.J.Rao & Co.

References

Villages in Srikakulam district
Maritime history of India